Paweł Żyra (born 7 April 1998) is a Polish professional footballer who plays as a midfielder for Stal Mielec.

Club career
On 4 August 2020, he signed with Bruk-Bet Termalica Nieciecza.

On 21 June 2022, Żyra joined Ekstraklasa club Stal Mielec on a two-year contract.

References

External links
 

1998 births
People from Wałbrzych
Sportspeople from Lower Silesian Voivodeship
Living people
Polish footballers
Poland youth international footballers
Association football midfielders
Zagłębie Lubin players
Chojniczanka Chojnice players
Bruk-Bet Termalica Nieciecza players
Stal Mielec players
Ekstraklasa players
I liga players
III liga players